Brian Charles Ellis (born 28 April 1950) is an Australian politician. He was a Liberal member of the Western Australian Legislative Council from 2007 to 2017, representing the Agricultural Region.

Ellis was first elected to parliament on a countback, following the resignation of fellow Liberal Margaret Rowe.

Ellis was born in Wongan Hills, Western Australia. He was a farmer prior to entering politics.

References

External links
 WA Parliament bio

1950 births
Living people
Members of the Western Australian Legislative Council
Liberal Party of Australia members of the Parliament of Western Australia
21st-century Australian politicians